Philip Joseph Alvin (born March 6, 1953) is an American singer and guitarist known primarily as the leader of the rock band The Blasters. His voice has been described as "robust...powerful...rich, resonant, [and] supremely confident."

Biography
Alvin grew up in Downey, California in a music-loving family where he and his younger brother Dave Alvin were exposed to blues, rockabilly, and country. Inspired and influenced by the music they grew up with, Phil and Dave formed the rock and roll band The Blasters in the late 1970s with fellow Downey residents Bill Bateman and John Bazz. The group released four studio albums between 1980 and 1985. While never achieving mass market success on the music charts, the group's recordings and concerts drew critical acclaim and a cult following across the United States and Europe.

In 1986, after The Blasters had disbanded, Alvin released a solo album, Un "Sung Stories". He then returned to graduate school at California State University, Long Beach, where he eventually earned a master's degree in mathematics and artificial intelligence. Numerous accounts have stated that Alvin earned a Ph.D. degree. However, there is reason to believe that this accepted wisdom is not accurate, and that Alvin's most advanced degree is in fact a master's degree. Incidentally, before launching his music career, Alvin had taught mathematics at the same university.

When The Blasters reconvened in 1986 without Dave Alvin, who was pursuing a solo career and other projects, Phil resumed his role as the band's lead vocalist, rhythm guitarist, and harmonica player. In 1994, he released a second solo album, County Fair 2000. In 2005, under Alvin's leadership, a revised configuration of The Blasters released 4-11-44, the first studio album from the group since 1985. The band followed that effort in 2012 with the studio album, Fun On Saturday Night.

In June 2012, while playing in Spain with The Blasters, Alvin had a near-death experience owing to an infection from an abscessed tooth. Though he had an emergency tracheotomy and flatlined twice, he recovered with his voice intact.

In 2014, Phil and Dave Alvin released the album Common Ground, a selection of Big Bill Broonzy covers, as a duo. It was the first studio collaboration by the Alvin brothers since the mid-1980s. They followed up with Lost Time in 2015.

More than 40 years after The Blasters got started, and despite ongoing health concerns in recent years,  Phil Alvin remains their frontman. The lineup includes two other original members, John Bazz and Bill Bateman, as well as Keith Wyatt.

Discography

with The Blasters
American Music (1980)
The Blasters (1981)
Over There  (1982)
Non Fiction (1983)
 Hard Line (1985)
The Blasters Collection (1990)
Testament: The Complete Slash Recordings (2002)
The Blasters Live - Going Home (2004)
4-11-44 (2005)
Fun On Saturday Night (2012)

Solo albums
Un "Sung Stories"  (1986)
County Fair 2000  (1994)
Common Ground: Dave & Phil Alvin Play and Sing the Songs of Big Bill Broonzy (with Dave Alvin) (2014)
 Lost Time (with Dave Alvin) (2015)

The Blasters videography
Streets of Fire (1984)
The Blasters Live-Going Home (2004)

References

External links
The Blasters official website

1953 births
Living people
American blues singers
American harmonica players
American rock guitarists
American male guitarists
American rock singers
California State University, Long Beach alumni
California State University, Long Beach faculty
Cowpunk musicians
Musicians from Downey, California
The Blasters members
Slash Records artists
Guitarists from California
20th-century American guitarists
20th-century American male musicians